Mount Woods is a bare, ridge-like mountain in Antarctica, 1,170 m, standing 4.5 nautical miles (8 km) northeast of O'Connell Nunatak in the Anderson Hills in central Patuxent Range, Pensacola Mountains. It was mapped by the United States Geological Survey (USGS) from surveys and U.S. Navy air photos from 1956 to 1966. It was named by the Advisory Committee on Antarctic Names (US-ACAN) for Clifford R. Woods Jr., a hospital corpsman at Palmer Station during the winter of 1967. The honor was bestowed after Woods saved the life of his superior officer in the midst of a year long Naval deployment. Clifford Woods Jr. died in LaFollette, Tennessee on September 11, 2022.

References 

Mountains of Queen Elizabeth Land
Pensacola Mountains